The Orava is a river in north-western Slovakia passing through a picturesque country, in the Orava county. Its source is nowadays the Orava water reservoir whose waters flooded the confluence of Biela (White) Orava and Čierna (Black) Orava in 1953. It flows into the river Váh near the village of Kraľovany.

Etymology
The name "Orava" may be of Pre-Slavic or Slavic origin. Pre-Slavic *er-/*or-: fast, swift (swift river). Proto-Slavic *or-, *orati: to scream, to roar. Slovak rivers Revúca and Hučava have the same etymology (a roaring river). The similar names from other Slavic countries are e.g. the Croatian river Orljava (1234 Orauua), the Ukrainian river and the village Oriava or Orzawiec (in the river system of Dnieper).  The suffix -ava could be derived from Germanic -ahwa (water), but it is typical also for older Slovak hydronyms.  The Hungarian name Árva is a phonetic adaptation similar to Okol > Akol, Okoličná > Akalichna, Obuš > Abos , etc.

The earliest records are fl. Arua (1287) and Oravia (1314).

References

External links
 Orava on Geonames

Rivers of Slovakia